Something Corporate (also known as SoCo) was an American rock band from Orange County, California, formed in 1998. Their last line-up included vocalist and pianist Andrew McMahon, guitarists Josh Partington and Bobby Anderson, bassist Kevin Page and drummer Brian Ireland.

Following their formation, Something Corporate recorded demos that were eventually released as an independent, studio album entitled Ready... Break. Soon after, they were signed to MCA Records but were released under the Drive-Thru Records banner for their debut EP Audioboxer.  Their first single, "If You C Jordan", was their most successful, peaking at number 29 on the Alternative Songs chart. Their first album released through the major label was Leaving Through the Window (2002) which premiered at  Number 1/Hot Shot Debut on the Billboard Top Heatseekers chart on June 8, 2002 and eventually peaked at number 101 on the Billboard 200.

Something Corporate went on hiatus in 2004 and no longer had any recording contracts with their record labels. During the hiatus, McMahon found success in his side-project Jack's Mannequin. Something Corporate briefly reunited in October 2006 (at a Jack's Mannequin show) to play a short set. In December 2009, Something Corporate officially announced their reunion to tour in 2010 and released a greatest hits album. McMahon announced during an August 3, 2010, visit to Milwaukee that the band had collectively sold over 1 million total records in the band's ten years of existence. On September 9, 2022 the band reunited to play a surprise show for McMahon’s 40th birthday at House of Blues in Anaheim, CA.

History

Formation and early releases (1998–2002)
Andrew McMahon and Brian Ireland had a class together at Dana Hills High School, during which the pair often talked about music. Ireland received a drum set for Christmas, and the pair subsequently started a band with bassist Kevin "Clutch" Page. The group, known as Left Here, was formed for a Battle of the Bands contest. Despite winning, they ended up breaking up shortly afterwards. In September 1998, McMahon, Page, and Ireland, merged with lead guitarist Josh Partington and rhythm guitarist Reuben Hernandez, to form Something Corporate. Following a few shows, McMahon realised that he would be unable to pursue a career in music if he was in education. McMahon's parents were supportive of his music, but suggested doing college applications if the band didn't work out within a year. The group were unable to secure gigs due to being underage outside of parties and various Battle of the Bands competitions. During this time, the group shared an apartment in Dana Point, where McMahon wrote a number of the band's early material.

Throughout high school the band tried to play at local venue the Coach House, which was owned by Gary Folgner. He kept declining the band's offers as they didn't have any releases out. However, when Folgner saw the band live, he gave them money to record their debut album Ready... Break at the Coach House and Galaxy Theater. The band released Ready... Break in November 2000. On March 27, 2001, Something Corporate announced an official change to the band's lineup; Hernandez was replaced by William Tell. The band signed with MCA Records and Drive-Thru Records and released the band's official debut effort, an EP titled Audioboxer (2001). It was promoted nationwide through tours, in-store performances at Tower Records stores and a television appearance on The Late Late Show with Craig Kilborn on February 25, 2002. The EP featured the single "If U C Jordan", with its music video starring American Pie's Chris Owen.

Debut album and follow-up (2002–2004)
In May 2002, Something Corporate released their debut major label album, Leaving Through the Window. It contained the singles "I Woke Up in a Car" and "Punk Rock Princess". The album hit number one on the Billboard Top Heatseekers chart and number 101 on the Billboard 200. Something Corporate released a half-hour home video on DVD, titled A Year in the Life in November 2002. Furthermore, they released the B-sides compilation EP Songs for Silent Movies,  only available in Japan.

In October 2003, Something Corporate released their second full-length record, North. The album debuted at number 24 on the Billboard 200. They launched the album with an appearance on Jimmy Kimmel Live!, performing the songs "If U C Jordan" and "Space", the latter of which became the only single from the album. In February 2004, it was confirmed that William Tell had left Something Corporate to pursue a solo career. Bobby Anderson, formerly of the band River City High, became Tell's replacement. After Tell's departure Ireland assisted in the recording of his debut album, You Can Hold Me Down. Ireland has several credits on the album, including drums, programming, and background vocals. Ireland also toured and performed live as part of Tell's band. On May 20, 2004, Something Corporate filmed its concert at the Ventura Theater in Ventura, California. The footage was released as the band's second DVD, Live at the Ventura Theater, on November 9. The band supported its release with a short two-week college tour in November.

Hiatus (2004–2009)
In summer 2004, the band grew exhausted from spending years on the road and decided to take a break. The band promised the break would not be a permanent one in a 2005 interview with Concert Pipeline. McMahon said "I think for all of us it just got to the point where we were like 'Let's just go be our own people for a minute'-- not out of a desire to leave the band or break up Something Corporate-- quite the opposite.  Let's reconnect with all the things that spawned the band in the first place." In January and February 2005, the band toured across the U.S. alongside Straylight Run, Hidden in Plain View, The Academy Is..., and Armor for Sleep.  In April, 2005 the band played an outdoor concert at Phi Sigma Kappa fraternity at Indiana University as part of Little 500 festivities.

During the hiatus, McMahon, Hernandez, and Anderson formed a side project named Jack's Mannequin. The band released an album entitled Everything in Transit in August 2005. The day that recording for the album was completed, McMahon was diagnosed with acute lymphoblastic leukemia. He has since gone into remission. In 2008, McMahon released a second album with Jack's Mannequin, The Glass Passenger. The album debuted at number eight on the Billboard 200, surpassing the success he achieved with Something Corporate. Partington also formed the band Firescape, who have released an EP and studio album. In 2006, Ireland joined the Louisiana-based band Streamline as their drummer. He wrote two songs ("Let Go" and "Anything") for Streamline's 2009 EP, The Alchemist and the Arsonist but left the band in November 2009. Ireland formed the band Live Oak Revue with his brothers, Derek and Matt Ireland, and friend Zak Salazar and released the EP, When the Dawn Breaks, on June 21, 2011. McMahon is featured on the track "Sinner's Heart."

In December 2005, the band announced they would re-group in January 2006 for rehearsals and plan to write their third album. In July 2006, McMahon said the group's hiatus wouldn't be permanent, and that they talked of touring early-to-mid 2007 and enter the studio after McMahon was finished working on the second Jack's Mannequin album. In October 2006, Something Corporate reunited to perform three songs; "Konstantine", "I Woke Up in a Car" and "Hurricane". They played at the end of McMahon's set with Jack's Mannequin at the Bamboozle Left festival. In December 2007, McMahon said that Something Corporate's status as a band could be described as is in "suspended animation". He told Alternative Press that he is more "nostalgically charged" than "creatively charged" to make another Something Corporate record.

In a February 2009 interview with Lansing State Journal, Andrew McMahon discussed the future of Something Corporate. He said, "As for releasing a full-length with a tour in the classic sense, I don't see that happening. But we're all great friends, and I do see us putting together new material and hitting the road. The fans have been so supportive and such a huge part of our lives that I would feel horrible not to at least give them something."

Reunions (2009–2010, 2016, 2022-2023)

On December 3, 2009, it was announced that they would be playing the Bamboozle Left Festival in Anaheim, California on March 28, 2010. On February 22 at the House of Blues in Chicago, Andrew McMahon announced that Something Corporate will be at Bamboozle Chicago on May 15.
On March 29, 2010, AbsolutePunk.net reported that Something Corporate will also be playing Bamboozle Right in East Rutherford, New Jersey, on May 1.

In February 2010, Andrew McMahon announced that Something Corporate was planning a greatest hits release for the spring of 2010. The band returned to the studio to re-record two old songs which originally appeared on their canceled "Galaxy Sessions" album: "Letters to Noelle" and "Wait". Adam Young of Owl City produced a new remix of "I Woke Up in a Car". The greatest hits album, named Played in Space: The Best of Something Corporate was released on April 27, 2010. On May 15, 2010, Something Corporate announced their August 2010 Reunion Tour on their website. In August 2011, McMahon said the band went back on hiatus.

On November 11, 2016 at the Seventh Annual Dear Jack Benefit, McMahon, Page, Ireland, Partington and Tell reunited to perform “Konstantine” and 
“Hurricane” at The Observatory in Santa Ana, California.

The final show of Andrew McMahon In The Wilderness' 2022 Hello Gone Days tour took place on September 9, 2022, in Anaheim, California and was a celebration of McMahon's 40th birthday. As part of the show, a surprise Something Corporate reunion was staged, where McMahon, Kevin Page, Brian Ireland, Josh Partington, and William Tell played a 5-song set. Wilderness band member Zac Clark sat in on keys.

Something Corporate was announced as part of the 2023 When We Were Young Festival in Las Vegas.

Musical style
AllMusic biographer Jason Birchmeier described the band's sound "polished, literate, radio-ready alt-rock."Leaving Through the Window and North have been described as pop punk.

Band members

Final line-up
Andrew McMahon - lead vocals, piano (1998–2006, 2010)
Josh Partington - lead guitar, backing vocals (1998–2006, 2010)
Kevin "Clutch" Page - bass guitar (1998–2006, 2010)
Brian Ireland - drums, percussion (1998–2006, 2010)
Bobby "Raw" Anderson - rhythm guitar, backing vocals (2004–2006, 2010)

Former members
Reuben Hernandez - rhythm guitar (1998–2001)
William Tell - rhythm guitar, backing vocals (2001–2004)

Discography

Studio albums

Extended plays

Compilations

Live and video albums

Singles

Non-album tracks/unreleased albums
 Galaxy Sessions (2001)
 "Just Like a Woman" (Bob Dylan cover) – released on Listen to Bob Dylan: A Tribute (2005)

References
Citations

Sources

External links
SomethingCorporate.com Official website
Something Corporate at PureVolume

Indie rock musical groups from California
Geffen Records artists
Drive-Thru Records artists
Emo musical groups from California
Musical groups established in 1998
Musical groups disestablished in 2006
Musical groups reestablished in 2010
Musical groups disestablished in 2010
Musical groups from Orange County, California
Musical quartets
American punk rock groups
Alternative rock groups from California